Ripped may refer to:

 Ripped, a slang term for having achieved muscle hypertrophy
 Ripped: How the Wired Generation Revolutionized Music, a book by Greg Kot
 Ripped, a series of books and DVDs by Clarence Bass
 "Ripped", an episode of Law & Order: Special Victims Unit
 Ripped, a 2017 comedy film starring Faizon Love and Russell Peters

See also 

 
 Ripping, the process of copying audio or video content to a hard disk
 RIPD (disambiguation)
 Rip (disambiguation)